

References
  (phenylalanine)
  (phenylalanine)
  (D-phenylalanine)
  (L-phenylalanine)

Chemical data pages
Chemical data pages cleanup